The 1975 Atlanta Falcons season was the franchise's tenth year in the National Football League (NFL). With the first overall pick of the NFL draft, the Falcons selected quarterback Steve Bartkowski out of the University of California. However, the pick would do them no good as the Falcons slumped to another miserable 4–10 record and missed the playoffs for the 10th straight season. This was also the first and only full season for head coach Marion Campbell until the 1980s, as he was hired to coach the final 6 games of the previous season and was fired 5 games into the following season.

Offseason

NFL Draft

Personnel

Staff

Roster

Regular season

Schedule

Note: Intra-division opponents are in bold text.

Standings

Game summaries

Week 1: at St. Louis Cardinals

References

External links
 1975 Atlanta Falcons at Pro-Football-Reference.com

Atlanta Falcons
Atlanta Falcons seasons
Atlanta